Paul Stolper Gallery is a contemporary art gallery in Museum Street, Bloomsbury, London. It was established in 1998.

References

External links
 

Contemporary art galleries in London
Tourist attractions in the London Borough of Camden
1998 establishments in England